Lina Tullgren is an American musician from South Berwick, Maine.

History
Tullgren's first musical output was an EP in 2015 titled Wishlist. The following year, upon signing to the record label Captured Tracks, Tullgren re-released their EP. In September 2017, Tullgren announced plans to release their debut full-length album. The album, titled Won, was released on September 22, 2017. In 2019, Tullgren announced plans to release their second full-length album. The album, titled Free Cell, was released on August 23, 2019. The album received a 7.3 out of 10 from Pitchfork. In 2021, Ba Da Bing released VISITING, an album of solo violin pieces.

Discography

Studio albums
Won (2017, Captured Tracks)
Free Cell (2019, Captured Tracks)
VISITING (2021, Ba Da Bing)

EPs
Wishlist (2015, self- released; re-released in 2016, Captured Tracks)

References

Living people
Musicians from Maine
People from South Berwick, Maine
Year of birth missing (living people)